The Bisati` are a  Muslim community, found in North India. Many members of this community migrated to Pakistan in 1947 and have settled in Karachi and Sindh.

History and origin

The Bisati -known as Punjabi biradri are said to get their name from the word bisat''', which means goods spread out for sale. They are a community of peddlers and traders. According to their traditions, they have emigrated from BEHRA now in Pakistan, during the period of Shahjahan rule.  They are said to have initially settled in Punjab, and then moved different parts of India.
They are now found mainly in Kashmir, Lucknow, Kanpur, Faizabad and other parts of Awadh, as well as the districts of Meerut and Saharanpur in the Doab, and in Gopalganj District of Bihar. The community have sub_clans known as biradaris'', the most important being the Ansari, Hashmi, Khan, Kazi and Mirza. Technically, marriages are said to occur within the biradari, and all biradari members trace their descent from a common ancestor. They have titles like Ahmed and Beg.

Present circumstances

The Bisati have general merchandise business as their main source of income. Many are also vendors of goods such as bangles, buttons and cosmetics. They consider themselves of Shaikh status. In Uttar Pradesh, the Bisati are Sunni Muslims, and speak Urdu, and various dialects of Hindi.

The Bisati in Bihar are found throughout the state, with especial concentrations in Gopalganj district. Like the Uttar Pradesh Bisati, they are peddlers, selling hosiery and locally manufactured toys.  Like other South Asian communities, they are strictly endogamous, and practice both cross cousin and parallel cousin marriages. There are now divisions within the community, with successful Bisati running their own businesses. The community are also involved in the running of small industries such as dyeing and weaving. They speak Bhojpuri and most have knowledge of Urdu.

See also
 Siddiqui
 Shaikhs in South Asia

References

Social groups of Pakistan
Social groups of Uttar Pradesh
Muslim communities of India
Shaikh clans
Muslim communities of Uttar Pradesh
Muslim communities of Bihar
Social groups of Bihar